The 2013 Men's African Volleyball Championship was the 19th edition of the Men's African Volleyball Championship, organised by Africa's governing volleyball body, the CAVB. It was held in Sousse, Tunisia from September 22 to 27, 2013.

Teams

Venue

Format
The competition system of the 2013 Men's African Championship is the single Round-Robin system. Each team plays once against each of the 5 remaining teams. Points are accumulated during the whole tournament, and the final ranking is determined by the total points gained.

Results
All times are Central European Time (UTC+01:00).

|}

|}

Final standing

Awards
MVP:  Abdellatif Othman
Best Receiver:  Noureddine Hfaiedh
Best Spiker:  Youssef Oughlef
Best Blocker:  Kamel Ouali
Best Server:  Ahmed Abdel Naeim
Best Setter:  Abdallah Abdessalam
Best Libero: Anouar Taouerghi

References

External links
Tunisian Volleyball Federation website

2013 Men
Men's African Volleyball Championship
African Men's Volleyball Championship
Men's African Volleyball Championship
International volleyball competitions hosted by Tunisia